The following lists events that happened during 1858 in Australia.

Incumbents

Governors
Governors of the Australian colonies:
Governor of New South Wales – Sir William Denison
Governor of South Australia – Shannon Amour Osborne
Governor of Tasmania – Sir Henry Young
Governor of Victoria – Sir Henry Barkly
Governor of Western Australia as a Crown Colony – Sir Arthur Kennedy

Premiers
Premiers of the Australian colonies:
Premier of New South Wales – Charles Cowper
Premier of South Australia – Richard Hanson
Premier of Tasmania – Francis Smith
Premier of Victoria – Dr William Haines (until 10 March), then John O'Shanassy

Events
 12 July – The first edition of The Advertiser newspaper is published in Adelaide, South Australia.
 7 August – The first recorded game of Australian rules football is played between Melbourne Grammar School and Scotch College at Yarra Park.
 10 September – Fitzroy, Victoria becomes a municipality in its own right, after separating from the City of Melbourne.
 8 December – The construction of St Patrick's Cathedral, Melbourne begins.

Births

 28 January – Sir Edgeworth David, geologist and explorer (born in the United Kingdom) (d. 1934)
 18 June – Sir Hector Rason, 7th Premier of Western Australia (born in the United Kingdom) (d. 1927)
 2 July – King O'Malley, Tasmanian politician (born in the United States) (d. 1953)
 5 September – Victor Daley, poet (born in Ireland) (d. 1905)
 27 October – Sir Elliott Lewis, 19th Premier of Tasmania (d. 1935)
 17 December – John Barrett, Victorian politician (d. 1928)

Deaths

 16 February – Sir Charles Augustus FitzRoy, 10th Governor of New South Wales (born and died in the United Kingdom) (b. 1796)
 2 April – Sir Ralph Darling, 7th Governor of New South Wales (born in Ireland and died in the United Kingdom) (b. 1772)
 31 August – Elizabeth Underwood, settler (b. 1794)

References

 
Australia
Years of the 19th century in Australia